John Majisi (born 11 March 1956) is a Ghanaian politician and member of the Seventh Parliament of the Fourth Republic of Ghana representing the Krachi Nchumuru Constituency in the Volta Region on the ticket of the National Democratic Congress.

Personal life 
Majisi is a Christian (Seventh-day Adventist). He is married (with seven children).

Early life and education 
Majisi was born on 11 March 1956. He hails from Boafri, a town in the Volta Region of Ghana. He entered the University of Education, Winneb and obtained his MPhil in Special Education in 2007.

Politics 
Majisi is a member of the National Democratic Congress (NDC). In 2012, he contested for the Krachi Nchumuru seat on the ticket of the NDC sixth parliament of the fourth republic and won.

Employment 
 Lecturer, University of Education, Winneba
 Member of Parliament (7 January 2013 – present; 2nd term)

References

Ghanaian MPs 2017–2021
1956 births
Living people
National Democratic Congress (Ghana) politicians